San José is a municipality in the Honduran department of La Paz.

Demographics
At the time of the 2013 Honduras census, San José municipality had a population of 8,928. Of these, 95.12% were Indigenous (95.12% Lenca), 3.05% Mestizo, 1.39% Black or Afro-Honduran and 0.44% White.

References

Municipalities of the La Paz Department (Honduras)